Valevatn is a lake in the municipality of Sirdal in Agder county, Norway.  The  lake lies just north of the lake Gravatnet and a short distance west of the village of Kvæven.  There are two dams on the east side of the L-shaped lake.  The lake drains into the lake Gravatnet and the river Sira which runs just east of the lake.

See also
List of lakes in Norway

References

Sirdal
Lakes of Agder